Dave Brown (born February 28, 1976) is an American entrepreneur. He is the owner/founder of Holiday Matinee, a creative agency and co-founder of Better Looking Records, an independent record label.

Work
Brown established Holiday Matinee in February 1999, with an initial offering of music PR that helped launch the careers of Death Cab for Cutie, Bright Eyes and The Album Leaf, among others. Services later expanded to include management, design, music licensing, event planning and national youth marketing campaigns. Today, Holiday Matinee has become an active destination blog and offers consulting services to various brands and individuals looking to grow their ideas, products, events and businesses.

References

External links
 Holiday Matinee official website
 Better Looking Records official website

21st-century American businesspeople
Living people
1976 births